Charlie Rasmussen Gjedde (born 28 December 1979 in Holstebro, Denmark) is a former international motorcycle speedway rider from Denmark, who won the Speedway World Cup with Denmark in 2006.

Career 
A former Danish Under-21 Champion, Gjedde has represented Denmark in the Speedway World Cup since 2002 and has appeared as a track reserve in the Speedway Grand Prix series three times.

He first rode in Britain for Swindon Robins during the 1998 Elite League speedway season.

He rode for the Belle Vue Aces in the Elite League in 2008, 2009 and 2011.

See also 
 Denmark national speedway team

References

1979 births
Living people
Danish speedway riders
Speedway World Cup champions
Belle Vue Aces riders
Wolverhampton Wolves riders
Swindon Robins riders
Reading Racers riders
Oxford Cheetahs riders
People from Holstebro
Sportspeople from the Central Denmark Region